Acrocercops pylonias is a moth of the family Gracillariidae. It is known from Peru.

References

pylonias
Gracillariidae of South America
Moths described in 1921